Oleg Nikolayevich Salnikov (born 1 December 1975) is a Russian professional football coach and a former player. He is an assistant coach for the Under-19 squad of FC Rostov.

Club career
He played 4 seasons in the Russian Football National League for FC Spartak-Orekhovo Orekhovo-Zuyevo, FC Baltika Kaliningrad and FC Rubin Kazan.

References

1975 births
People from Leningrad Oblast
Living people
Russian footballers
Association football defenders
FC Baltika Kaliningrad players
FC Rubin Kazan players
FC Dynamo Stavropol players
FC Volga Nizhny Novgorod players
FC Sever Murmansk players
Russian football managers
FC Znamya Truda Orekhovo-Zuyevo players
Sportspeople from Leningrad Oblast